Mythic Warriors (also known as Mythic Warriors: Guardians of the Legend) is a 1998-2000 anthology animated television series, which featured retellings of popular Greek myths that were altered so as to be appropriate for younger audiences, produced by Nelvana and Marathon Media. Two seasons of episodes were produced in February 8, 1998 and March 14, 1999; then aired as reruns until May 21, 2000, when CBS' abolition of its Nelvana-produced children's programming in favor of Nick Jr. and later, Nickelodeon content resulted in its cancellation. The series was based on the book series Myth Men Guardians of the Legend written in 1996 and 1997 by Laura Geringer and illustrated by Peter Bollinger.

The series was a fixture of CBS' Saturday-morning cartoon lineup. Scottish Television screened the series as part of its children  programme Inside Out.  The show was repeat in 2009 on wknd@stv, which is a children's television strand on Scottish television channel, then on Saturday mornings on STV during 2010. The series has been translated into Scottish Gaelic and is broadcast on BBC Alba since 2010.

Most of the characters in the show are portrayed with their original Greek names, with a few Romanized exceptions (e.g. Hercules, Ulysses).

Myth Men
Myth Men Guardians of the Legend is a book series written in 1996 and 1997 by Laura Geringer and illustrated by Peter Bollinger. It is a comic series targeted at children age 4-8 and published by Scholastic Books, Inc. It received the Children's Choice award.

The series includes both male and female mythical heroes, including Perseus, Heracles, Odysseus, Theseus, Andromeda and Atalanta. The books retell the actual myths and legends with added fantasy elements.

Premise

Depictions of gods
 
This show is well known for its unique depictions of the Greek gods. Most were shown as gigantic (approximately 10–12 feet tall) humanoids possessing immortality, the abilities to fly and teleport, supernatural powers of a magical nature (as opposed to cosmic), and the ability to alter their appearances at will; including reducing themselves to the size of a typical human, as well as completely altering their looks, voices, and even gender. When in their natural form, an echo would accompany their voice whenever they spoke.

Instead of classic attire resembling that of human nobility often employed during Hellenic times, the Olympians were instead depicted as wearing brightly colored clothing more typical of a warrior's formal attire, the exceptions being Hera, Demeter, and Hephaestus.

Between the first and second seasons, the depictions of several gods changed. Hades' attire was slightly altered. Persephone aged from a teenage-looking young girl to a grown goddess. The most significant changes, however, were to Aphrodite and Athena; the former shifted from a giggling pencil-thin schoolgirl-like teenager, to a conniving fully mature armor-clad lust goddess, with an entirely different voice and manner of speech as well. Athena was altered from a blonde in monotonous silver armor; to a brunette cloaked in blood-red dual-split dress with matching cape, plus golden shin guards and arm-bands in addition. Despite the complete change in depiction, her voice did remain the same.

Featured Gods
 Zeus – King of the gods, ruler of Olympus, and god of the sky, justice, thunder, and lightning. He is the father of Hercules and Perseus.
 Hera – Queen of the gods and goddess of the sky, marriage and childbirth.
 Hades – God of the Underworld, the Dead, wealth and burial. He is the husband of Persephone.
 Demeter – Goddess of fertility, grain, agriculture and harvest. She is the mother of Persephone.
 Poseidon – God of the sea, horses and earthquakes. He is the father of Pegasus and Theseus.
 Hermes – Messenger of the gods; god of travelers, trickery, commerce, messages, international trade, wit, thieves, speed and invention.
 Athena – Goddess of wisdom, battles, crafts, battle tactics, warriors, handcrafts and reason. One of only three virgin goddesses.
 Ares – God of war, murder and bloodshed. Because of his role in mythology, his role in the show was limited.
 Apollo – God of light, music, prophecies, poetry, medicine, truth, archery and (in Hellenistic myths) replaced Helios as god of the sun. He was to become known as "Phoebus Apollo". He is the twin brother of Artemis.
 Artemis – Virgin goddess of the hunt, wilderness, virginity, fertility, children, childbirth and wildlife. In Hellenistic myths, she replaced Selene as goddess of the moon. She is the twin sister of Apollo.
 Hephaestus – The Gods' Blacksmith; god of the forge, fire, metalworking, volcanoes, arts and crafts.
 Aphrodite – Goddess of love and beauty. Formally known to be the most beautiful of the goddesses.
 Dionysus – God of wine, intoxication, mysteries, drama, revelry and disorderly conduct. Dionysus is the only demigod to have the divinity of an Olympian. Replaced Hestia as the 12th pantheon member.
 Helios – The Hellenic sun god. His role was later usurped by (Phoebus) Apollo in Hellenistic myths.
 Eros – God of lust and infatuation. The son of Aphrodite.
 Persephone – Goddess of Spring and Queen of the underworld. She is the daughter of Demeter and the wife of Hades.

Gods who made cameo appearances
 Pan – God of shepherds and rustic music.
 Hebe – Goddess of youth, cupbearer to the gods; daughter of Zeus and Hera.
 Hecate – Goddess of night/nighttime, sorcery/magic, witchcraft, mystery, crossroads, the Moon, and the horrors of nature. She is the mother of Scylla.
 Zephyrus – God of the West Wind.
 Boreas – God of the North Wind.
 Notus – God of the South Wind.
 Eurus – God of the East Wind.
 Achelous – A River God who battled Heracles/Hercules.

Featured Titans
 Alcyoneus – In this show, Alcyoneus is featured as a Titan King despite the fact that he is actually a Gigantes and not a Titan. The actual King of the Titan was Cronus who was the father of Zeus, Poseidon, Hades, Hera, Demeter, and Hestia.
 Atlas – Atlas holds up the sky.
 Epimetheus – Brother of Prometheus and the deity who brought animals into the world. 
 Prometheus – Titan who defied Zeus by giving fire to mankind and was punished by being chained to a mountainside and tormented by eagles. After humanity proves its worth, Zeus forgives Prometheus and has him released at the hands of Hercules.

Episode list

Season 1
 Andromeda: The Warrior Princess (November 7, 1998) – 
 Hercules and Iolas (November 14, 1998) – 
 Odysseus: The Journey Home (November 21, 1998) – 
 Perseus: The Search For Medusa (November 28, 1998) – 
 Jason and the Argonauts: The Search for the Golden Fleece (December 5, 1998) – 
 Persephone and the Winter Seeds (December 12, 1998) – 
 Icarus and Daedalus (December 19, 1998) – 
 Odysseus and Circe (December 26, 1998) – 
 Atalanta: The Wild Girl (January 2, 1999) – 
 Prometheus and Pandora's Box (January 9, 1999) – 
 Bellerophon and Pegasus (January 16, 1999) – 
 Theseus and the Minotaur (January 23, 1999) – 
 The Labours of Hercules (January 30, 1999) –

Season 2
 Psyche and Eros – 
 Odysseus and the Trojan Horse – 
 Odysseus and Penelope: A Kingdom Lost – 
 Hercules and the Golden Apples – 
 Cadmus and Europa – 
 Jason and Medea – 
 Damon and Pythias – 
 Castor and Pollux – 
 The Hounds of Actaeon – 
 Phaeton: The Chariot of Fire – 
 Androcles and the Lion – 
 King Midas: The Golden Touch – 
 Hercules and the Titans: The Last Battle – After being denied a throne on Mount Olympus by Zeus despite Athena's vision, Hephaestus is tempted by Alcyoneus into freeing the Titans from Tartarus. Zeus and Athena work to convince Hercules to help them fight the Titans.

Cast
 Denis Akiyama as Polyphemus the Cyclops, Amycus
 Emilie-Claire Barlow as Siren #2
 Lawrence Bayne as Hercules, War Spirit
 Rick Bennett as Ares (1st Time)
 Zachary Bennett as Talos
 Tyrone Benskin as Elpenor
John Blackwood as Calais
 James Blendick as Narrator
Stephen Boggaert as Hermes (3rd Time)
 Kristen Bone as Hope Spirit
 Natalie Brown as Atalanta (2nd Time)
 Valerie Buhagiar as Queen Telephasse
Donald Burda as Lyceus
 George Buza as King Minos (1st Time), Gorgus
 Lally Cadeau as Athena (2nd Time)
 Sally Cahill as Medea
 Benedict Campbell as Daedalus, Perimedes, King Midas
Cole Caplan as Iolaus's Brother
 Juan Chioran as Antonius
 Richard Clarkin as Hermes (1st Time)
 Jesse Collins as Apollo
 Vincent Corazza as Cilix
 Alyson Court as Delona
 Amos Crawley as Icarus
 Lisa Dalbello as Graeae 
 Jennifer Dale as Medusa
 Tony Daniels as 
Richard Denison as Achelous
 Daniel DeSanto as Iolaus
 Philip DeWilde as Cadmus
Francis Diakowsky as Poseidon
 Don Dickinson as King Iobates
 Catherine Disher as Aethra
 Cathal J. Dodd as Lucius
 Robin Dunne as Perseus
Christopher Earle as Prince Meleager
Adrian Egan as Deceit Spirit, King Agenor
Michael Fletcher as Iphicles
 Colin Fox as King Cepheus, King Menelaus
 Edward Glen as Ictinus
 Janet-Laine Green as Hera
 Katie Griffin as Siren #4
Nicky Guadecki as Princess Danaë
 Paul Haddad as Theseus
 Michael Hall as Actaeon
 Elizabeth Hanna as Artemis
 Terri Hawkes as Pandora
 David Hemblen as Hephaestus
Ellen-Ray Hennessy as Graeae 
 Dan Hennessey as Nessus
Tori Higginson as Circe
Roger Honeywell as Odysseus
 Pam Hyatt as Jealousy Spirit
 Loretta Jafelice as Despair Spirit
 Howard Jerome as Polites
 Taborah Johnson as Siren #3
David Klar as Young Damon
 Lorne Kennedy as Philonoe, King Minos (2nd Time)
Gary Krawford as Zeus, Eumaeus
 Wendy Lands as Aphrodite
 Caroly Larson as Andromeda, Atalanta (1st Time)
Shannon Lawson as Queen Cassiopeia
 Ron Lea as Chiron (1st Time)
 Julie Lemieux as Penelope
 Shauna MacDonald as Lachesis
 Jonathan Malen as Young Castor and Pollux
Judy Marshak as Graeae #3, Ecylceia
 Diego Matamoros as Antiphus
Shiela McCarthy as Clotho
 Scott McCord as Phineus
 Dean McDermott as Phoenix
Hamish McEwan as Prince Dionus
 Tracey Moore as Siren #1, Iolaus' Sister
Kristina Nicoll as Helen
 Deborah Odell as Deianira
 Colin O'Meara as Cimon
 David Orth as Jason
 Stephen Ouimette as Dionysus
 Reagan Pasternak as Europa
 Ross Petty as King Pelias
 Jonathan Potts as Prometheus
 Toby Proctor as Telemachus
 Karl Pruner as Chiron (2nd Time)
 John Ralston as Paris
 James Rankin as Figgis
 Martin Roach as Lycopheus
 Wayne Robson as Eurystheus
 Susan Roman as Aspasia
 Tony Rosato as Orpheus
 Ron Rubin as Axos, Brutocus
 Tyrone Savage as Young Achilles
 Cedric Smith as King Polydectes
 Lyon Smith as Pythias
Robert Smith as Epimetheus, Hate Spirit
 Linda Sorenson as Demeter
 Norm Spencer as Hades
Greg Spottiswood as Bellerophon
Kent Staines as King Aeëtes, Boreas
 Rob Stefaniuk as Phaëton
 Allen Stewart-Coates as Ares (2nd Time)
 John Stocker as Zetes, Polemius
 Joy Tanner as Cybele
Wendy Thatcher as Athena (1st Time)
 Robert Tinkler as Androcles
 Adrian Truss as Arios
 Maria Vacratsis as Hecate, Atropos
 Chris Wiggins as Great Oracle, King Proetus
 Philip Williams as King Polydectes' Advisor
Rod Wilson as Castor
 Maurice Dean Wint as Atlas, Alcyoneus
Victor A. Young as King Glaucus
 Lenore Zann as Persephone
Bob Zidel as Helios

References

External links
 
Mythic Warriors on STV Player

1990s Canadian animated television series
2000s Canadian animated television series
1998 Canadian television series debuts
2000 Canadian television series endings
Canadian children's animated action television series
Canadian children's animated adventure television series
Canadian children's animated fantasy television series
1990s French animated television series
2000s French animated television series
1998 French television series debuts
2000 French television series endings
French children's animated action television series
French children's animated adventure television series
French children's animated fantasy television series
CBS original programming
Teen superhero television series
Television series about Heracles
Television series based on classical mythology
Television series by Nelvana
Television series set in ancient Greece